Brunni is a recreational area in the municipality of Engelberg, Obwalden, Switzerland. Located on a south-facing slope, it is known as "Engelberg's sunny side". Since 1950 it is connected by railway thanks to Brunni-Bahnen Engelberg AG.

References

External links 
 Website der Brunni-Bahnen Engelberg
 Walenpfad auf wandersite.ch

Engelberg
Ski areas and resorts in Switzerland